Ghatampur is a town and a municipal board in Kanpur Nagar district in the state of Uttar Pradesh, India. It is located near main industrial and educational hubs of the state Kanpur at a distance of 40 km.

History

About 15 km North-East of Ghatampur is a small town named Bhitargaon which has a historical temple from the Gupta Period. Ghatampur was part of Kanpur district but was merged with Kanpur Nagar after the district's bifurcation into Kanpur Nagar and Kanpur Rural.

Earlier, Ghatampur was both  Vidhan Sabha and a La ok Sabha constituency for ethe lection process. The reshuffling of seats by Dthe Election Commission of India led to the creation of a new Akbarpur Lok Sabha constituency in the 2008 General Elections.

Geography
It has an average elevation of 122 meters (400 feet)
Ghatampur is situated about 30–40 km from southwest from Kanpur Downtown and about 130 km from Lucknow (State Capital).

Demographics
The Ghatampur city is divided into 25 wards for which elections are held every 5 years. The Ghatampur Nagar Palika Parishad has population of 40,623 of which 21,334 are males while 19,289 are females as per report released by Census India 2011. Population of Children with age of 0-6 is 5244 which is 12.91% of total population of Ghatampur (NPP). In Ghatampur Nagar Palika Parishad, Female Sex Ratio is of 904 against state average of 912. Moreover Child Sex Ratio in Ghatampur is around 928 compared to Uttar Pradesh state average of 902. Literacy rate of Ghatampur city is 75.51% higher than state average of 67.68%. In Ghatampur, Male literacy is around 80.03% while female literacy rate is 70.49%.

Festivals

Kushmanda or Kudaha devi temple is a well-known worship place of Ghatampur. People celebrate "Deepdan" on the fourth day of Navaratri. Navaratri is best time to visit Ghatampur due to a crowded fair at Kushmanda devi temple. Post navaratri a five-day Ramlila and Krishna Leela is held in the city.

The second biggest festival of Ghatampur is "Shivaratri". The third biggest festival in Ghatampur is Adbhut baraat on the day of shivratri.

Education 
Ghatampur is progressively developing area regarding education and other facilities. The town has several Government and Private institutions. Some famous schools for High school and Intermediate are Maharshi D. B. L. Inter College (located in Umari), Shri Gandhi Vidyapeeth Inter College (Government Aided Inter College), Janta inter college, Islamia Inter college,  Government girls inter college (GGIC). This town also have a Government Polytechnic College and Government Industrial Training Institute (ITI) . This town also has several degree colleges and higher institution. Some famous Higher institutions are Sant Viragi Baba Mahavidyalaya, Purshottam Sri Ram Degree College etc.

Administration 
Ghatampur Nagar Palika Parishad has total administration over 7,407 houses to which it supplies basic amenities like water and sewerage. It is also authorize to build roads within Nagar Palika Parishad limits and impose taxes on properties coming under its jurisdiction. Ghatampur Nagar Palika is headed by Sanjay Sachan.

Politics 
Ghatampur Vidhansabha is also an area of many famous and strong politicians Like Late Cabinet minister Shivnath Singh Kushwaha 'Babu Ji', Late cabinet minister 'Chaudhary Narendra Singh', Late minister 'Ramasrey agnihotri', Late cabinet minister 'Kamal rani Varun', Cabinet minister Rakesh Sachan.

Popular places
Ghatampur is not popular tourist destination but it has many popular old t-me temples like Kushmanda Devi Temple in the town, Gupta-era Brick teTple in Bhitargaon village, Jagannath Temple in Behta Bujurg, Bhadreshwar Mahadev Temple in Nibiyakheda,  Bhadrakali Temple in Bhadras Village and Shri Ratneswar Shiv Mandir near Laukaha village.

Transportation
Ghatampur is well connected with other parts of the country by rail and road transport. It is situated between junction of National Highway 34 (India) (connecting Uttarakhand to Madhya Pradesh via Kanpur City) and UP State Highway 46 (bypass for NH 19).

CNG buses run between Kanpur and Ghatampur as part of Kanpur City Transport Service Ltd. UPSRTC buses going to Hamirpur and Mahoba from Kanpur also have stopovers. There is one direct bus to Delhi from bus station.

Ghatampur town also has a railway station under the Northern Central zone. There are daily trains with connectivity to Kanpur Central railway station, Lucknow, Chitrakoot and Jabalpur. This station has two platforms and is served by express, Intercity and Ppassenger typesof trains.

Nearest airport is Kanpur Chakeri Airport for domestic flights to Kolkata, Delhi, and Mumbai. For other places and international flights, people need to travel to Lucknow.

Health Services

Ghatampur is growing tremendously in health sector areas. Ghatampur has Community Health Centre (CHC) which provides health services to rural and poor communities in and around the city. Ghatampur is also home to the National JALMA Institute of Leprosy and other mycobacterial disease, which majorly concentrates on diseases like leprosy, tuberculosis, filariasis , andother mycobacterial diseases.

Power Plant Project

The government has recently come up with constructing 3 x 660 total 1980 MW NUPPL (Neyveli Uttar Pradesh Power Limited) thermal power plant in the Ghatampur area of District Kanpur Nagar in Uttar Pradesh India.

Popular culture
The Uttar Pradesh government on Saturday entered into a joint venture agreement with Neyveli Lignite Corporation Limited for the setting up of a 1980-MW thermal power plant in Ghatampur, Kanpur Nagar. The power plant was proposed at a cost of around Rs 11,130 crore. The power plant was scheduled to be commissioned in three stages beginning December 2016. Chief minister Akhilesh Yadav, who presided over the meeting, asked the officials to ensure timely completion of the project.

According to the agreement, UP and Neyveli Lignite Corporation Limited (NLCL) will have a share of 49% and 51% of the total cost. The state will be getting at least 64.39% of the total generation, and the state government will be releasing its share according to this ratio. The Principal Secretary (energy), Anil Kumar Gupta, said that keeping in view the demand for power in the state, the government has demanded a share of 75% of the total generation. "This way, UP will add between 1,275 Mw to 1,350 Mw of power, depending upon the share of the generation," he said. While UP Rajya Vidyut Utpadan Nigam Limited (UPRVUNL) was represented by managing director, Dheeraj Sahu, Neyveli Lignite Corporation Limited was represented by its chairman and managing director B. Sundar Mohan.

References

External links 
Uttar Pradesh Assembly Elections 2012
Ghatampur Assembly Elections 2012https://kanpurnagar.nic.in/tourist-place/bhitargaon-temple/
 statesPDF http://rcueslucknow.org › states PDF

Cities and towns in Kanpur Nagar district